S. Curtis Kiser (born June 17, 1944) was an American politician in the state of Florida.

Kiser was born in Oskaloosa, Iowa. He served in the Florida House of Representatives for the 54th district, as a Republican, from 1972 to 1982. He was Minority Leader of the House from 1980 to 1982.
He also served in the Florida Senate from 1984 to 1994 in Senate District 19. He Left his seat early to run for Lieutenant Governor under Tom Gallagher unsuccessfully in 1994.

References

1944 births
Living people
Republican Party members of the Florida House of Representatives
People from Palm Harbor, Florida
People from Oskaloosa, Iowa